Juana Saviñón Pérez (born September 13, 1980) is a volleyball player from the Dominican Republic, who competed for her native country at the 2004 Summer Olympics in Athens, Greece, wearing the number #8 jersey.

There she ended up in eleventh place with the Dominican Republic women's national team. Saviñón played as a wing-spiker.

Clubs 
 Evosancris (-1998)
 Mirador (1999–2003)
 Los Cachorros (2004)
 Mirador (2005)
 San Cristóbal (2007–2008)
 Centro (2009)
 La Romana (2010)
 Navarrete (2010)
 Los Mina (2011)

References

External links
 FIVB biography

1980 births
Living people
Dominican Republic women's volleyball players
Volleyball players at the 2004 Summer Olympics
Olympic volleyball players of the Dominican Republic
Dominican Republic people of Italian descent
Dominican Republic people of Canarian descent
Central American and Caribbean Games gold medalists for the Dominican Republic
Central American and Caribbean Games silver medalists for the Dominican Republic
Competitors at the 1998 Central American and Caribbean Games
Competitors at the 2002 Central American and Caribbean Games
Wing spikers
Central American and Caribbean Games medalists in volleyball